Donnchadh Ó Briain (17 November 1897 – 22 September 1981) was an Irish Fianna Fáil politician and Conradh na Gaeilge activist. 
He was elected to Dáil Éireann at the 1933 general election.

He was born 17 November 1897 in Knockaderry, County Limerick, one of two sons and a daughter of David O'Brien, a creamery manager, and Kathleen O'Brien (née Casey). He was educated at Ahalin national school and then at the Redemptorist College at Mount St Alphonsus, Limerick city, but was prevented from going to university by bouts of ill health.

On leaving school he worked in the creamery managed by his father for a number of years. By 1917 he had become involved in the independence movement as a member of Sinn Féin and later, of the West Limerick brigade of the Irish Republican Army. He was involved in the republican courts in Limerick and took the anti-treaty side in the Irish Civil War. 

He was deeply involved in the Conradh na Gaeilge, which he also joined in 1917, having been influenced by Fr Tomás de Bhál. In 1920 Ó Briain was appointed Conradh na Gaeilge organiser for County Limerick, and from 1925 he served in that role for all of Munster province, founding numerous branches of the league. From 1928 to 1932 he served as general secretary of the Conradh na Gaeilge and also intermittently edited Fáinne an Lae.

A founder member of Fianna Fáil in 1926, he stood unsuccessfully in Limerick at the 1932 general election. He served as a Fianna Fáil Teachta Dála (TD) for the Limerick and from 1948 for Limerick West constituencies until 1969 when he retired from politics. He served in the governments of Éamon de Valera and Seán Lemass as Government Chief Whip.

References

External links
Donnchadh Ó Briain in 'Politicians' file at Limerick City Library, Ireland

 

1897 births
1981 deaths
Fianna Fáil TDs
Members of the 8th Dáil
Members of the 9th Dáil
Members of the 10th Dáil
Members of the 11th Dáil
Members of the 12th Dáil
Members of the 13th Dáil
Members of the 14th Dáil
Members of the 15th Dáil
Members of the 16th Dáil
Members of the 17th Dáil
Members of the 18th Dáil
Parliamentary Secretaries of the 16th Dáil
Parliamentary Secretaries of the 14th Dáil
Government Chief Whip (Ireland)